Leeds Public School District 6 is a school district based in Leeds, North Dakota. It operates Leeds Public School.

Within Benson County it serves Leeds, Brinsmade, and York. Within Ramsey County it serves Churchs Ferry. It also includes portions of Pierce and Towner counties.

History
In 1958 the school district board was sued while trying to establish a school bond election, as the plaintiffs argued that the majority of the board was not from the rural areas that made up the majority of the district and therefore was not assembled properly under North Dakota law.

In 1987 there were 99 secondary level students. 66 of them were on the honor roll and 24 had consistent grades of "A". Donald Hoffman, the principal, stated that the students were meeting the rigorous standards of the district.

The Wolford School District was formally disestablished in 2019. Part of the district was to go to the Leeds district.

References

External links
 Leeds Public School
School districts in North Dakota
Education in Benson County, North Dakota
Education in Pierce County, North Dakota
Education in Ramsey County, North Dakota
Towner County, North Dakota